The 1951 Harvard Crimson football team was an American football team that represented Harvard University during the 1951 college football season. In their second year under head coach Lloyd Jordan, the Crimson compiled a 3–5–1 record and were outscored 266 to 143. Carroll M. Lowenstein and Warren D. Wylie were the team captains.

Harvard played its home games at Harvard Stadium in the Allston neighborhood of Boston, Massachusetts.

Schedule

References

Harvard
Harvard Crimson football seasons
Harvard Crimson football
1950s in Boston